Monmouth Land District is one of the twenty land districts of Tasmania which are part of the cadastral divisions of Tasmania. It was formerly one of the 18 counties of Tasmania. It is bordered by the River Derwent to the south, the Clyde River to the west, and a small part of the Jordan River to the north.

It includes the parts of Greater Hobart which are located to the east of the Derwent, such as Rosny Park and Bridgewater. It also includes Kempton and Hamilton.

The original parishes
On 15 January 1836 George Arthur, the Lieutenant Governor of the Island of Van Diemen's Land
proclaimed, via The Hobart Town Courier, the first counties and parishes to be surveyed in the colony.
 
 Eighth, The County of Monmouth, bounded on the north by Somersetshire; on the west by a portion of the Clyde to its junction with the Derwent, and thence on the south west by the Derwent to Storm bay; on the south by Storm bay and Frederick Henry bay; on the east by Pittwater and by the eastern boundaries of the parishes of Ulva, Staffa and Ormaig, and thence by a line to the junction of Beamont's rivulet with Little Swan port river. This county to include Betsey island and the Iron pot island. 

Hundreds and parishes proclaimed at this time were

 The hundred of Oatlands
Bath
York
Newick
Somerton
The hundred of Westbury
Westbury
Quamby
Sillwood
Adelphi
The hundred of Apsley
Rutland
Spring Hill
 Winterton
Apsley
The hundred of Picton
 Strangford
 Dysart
 Beaufort
 Huntingdon
The hundred of Bothwell
Vincent
Largo
Henry
Grantham
The hundred of Hamilton
Hamilton
Grafton
Pelham
Stradbroke
The hundred of Pontville
Wallace
Lansdowne,
Aldville
Arundel
The hundred of Brighton
Lewis
Staffa
Ulva
Drummond
The hundred of Bellerive
Forbes
Cambridge
Clarence
Ralph's Bay
The hundred of Yarlington
Ormaig
Yarlington
unnamed
unnamed

References

Land Districts of Tasmania